Cinnamon Skin (Spanish: Piel canela) is a 1953 Mexican drama film directed by Juan José Ortega and starring Sara Montiel, Manolo Fábregas and Ramón Gay. It was set and partly filmed in Cuba.

Cast
 Sara Montiel as Marucha  
 Manolo Fábregas as Dr. Carlos Alonso  
 Ramón Gay as Julio Chávez  
 Felipe de Alba as Dr. Jorge Morales  
 Rosa Elena Durgel as Alicia Álvarez, enfermera 
 Fernando Casanova as Paco  
 Magda Donato as Paciente loca de Alonso 
 Salvador Quiroz as Don Ernesto  
 Ismael Larumbe as Antonio Salas Porras  
 Jorge Casanova 
 Arturo Corona as Amigo de Antonio  
 Manuel de la Vega as Amigo de Antonio  
 Pedro Vargas as Cantante  
 Rosita Fornés as Cantante  
 Julio Gutiérrez 
 Olga Chaviano as Bailarina 
 Victorio Blanco as Empleado casino  
 Josefina Burgos as Mujer en casino  
 Rogelio Fernández as Esbirro de Julio  
 Ana Bertha Lepe as Empleada carpa  
 Chel López as Detective  
 José Muñoz as Cantinero  
 Rafael A. Ortega 
 Ignacio Peón as Hombre en casino  
 Alicia Reyna as Mesera  
 Joaquín Roche as Espectador gritón carpa

References

Bibliography 
 Rogelio Agrasánchez. Cine Mexicano: Posters from the Golden Age, 1936-1956. Chronicle Books, 2001.

External links 
 

1953 films
1953 drama films
Mexican drama films
1950s Spanish-language films
Films directed by Juan José Ortega
Films set in Cuba
Films shot in Cuba
1950s Mexican films